San Maria Maggiore is a Gothic-style, Roman Catholic parish church located on via San Maria Maggiore in the historic district of Civitanova  of Lanciano, region of Abruzzi, Italy.

History and description

Construction was in place by 1227, commissioned by the emperor Frederick II, putatively erected atop a former temple of Apollo built inside a forest sacred to the ancient inhabitants of the region. Excavations in the area found the remains of a previous 12th-century church. In the 13th century, the church was attached to a Benedictine convent. A refurbishment in 1317, inscribed in the portal, led to the gothic facade we see today with rose window, mullioned windows, and an ogival portal. The entrance portal is accessed from a broad set of stairs. The design has been attributed to the local master craftsman Francesco Petrini. 

In the tympanum above the entrance portal are three sculpted figures forming a crucifixion scene. Flanking the portal and columns with spiraling ribbons.

In the 16th-century, and additional facade with similar windows and a smaller portal was added on the south. By the mid-19th-century the church was in a dilapidated state, underwent a reconstruction in the following decades. The bello tower was built with gothic elements.

In 1402, the church was endowed with a gilded silver processional crucifix, attributed to Nicolandrea da Guardagrele. It reportedly was stolen in 1817 but presumably recovered.

References

13th-century Roman Catholic church buildings in Italy
Churches in the province of Chieti
Gothic architecture in Abruzzo